Charles Richard Nyers (born September 8, 1934) is a former American football player and coach. He played professionally for Baltimore Colts of the National Football League (NFL). He played college football at the University of Indianapolis. Nyers served as the head football coach at his alma mater from 1970 to 1971, compiling a record of 9–11. He was inducted into the Indiana Football Hall of Fame in 2014.

Head coaching record

References

1934 births
Living people
American football defensive backs
American football halfbacks
Ball State Cardinals football coaches
Baltimore Colts players
Indianapolis Greyhounds football coaches
Indianapolis Greyhounds football players
High school football coaches in Indiana
Players of American football from Indianapolis